Amynomachus (fl. 3rd century BC), son of Philocrates, from the Attic deme of Bate was, together with Timocrates son of Demetrius from Potamos, the heir of Epicurus (ca. 270 BC). Whether they were Epicurean philosophers themselves is uncertain. Epicurus' property was given to them  on condition that they give the Garden to Hermarchus and the other Epicureans. In this way Epicurus an Athenian citizen, ensures that Hermarchus and other non-Athenian Epicureans could remain in the Garden, although they cannot inherit legally the property.

Another Amynomachus, probably the grandfather of the heir (also Amynomachus son of Philocrates) appears in an epigraphic list of Athenian prytaneis (350 BC).

References

Bibliography

 (Diogenes Laertius ix. 16, 17; Cicero, de Finibus, ii. 31.)
 Facing Death: Epicurus and His Critics By James Warren Page 164 2006  
 The lives and opinions of eminent philosophers, tr. by C.D. Yonge By Diogenes Will of Epicurus

Epicurean philosophers
3rd-century BC philosophers
Hellenistic Athens
3rd-century BC Athenians
Ancient Athenian philosophers